Tyonek Airport  is a private-use airport located one nautical mile (1.85 km) northeast of the central business district of Tyonek, a village in the Kenai Peninsula Borough in the U.S. state of Alaska. It is owned by the Village of Tyonek.

As per Federal Aviation Administration records, the airport had 2,356 passenger boardings (enplanements) in calendar year 2008, a decrease of 27.7% from the 3,260 enplanements in 2007.

Facilities and aircraft 
Tyonek Airport has one runway designated 18/36 with a gravel surface measuring 3,000 by 90 feet (914 x 27 m). As per the most recent FAA records, for the 12-month period ending July 1, 1988, the airport had 2,605 aircraft operations: 77% air taxi and 23% general aviation.

References

External links 
 FAA Alaska airport diagram (GIF)
 Resources for this airport:
 
 
 

Defunct airports in Alaska
Airports in Kenai Peninsula Borough, Alaska